The 2021–22 season was Falkirk's third season in League One following their relegation from the Championship at the end of the 2018–19 season. Falkirk also competed in the League Cup, Challenge Cup and the Scottish Cup.

Summary
On 28 May 2021, former Aberdeen assistant coach Paul Sheerin was appointed as the club’s new head coach ahead of the new season. On 5 December 2021, Paul Sheerin was relieved of his duties as head coach. On 10 December, Martin Rennie was appointed as the new head coach of Falkirk. Former Scotland striker Kenny Miller, who joined the club as an assistant coach, would take over on an interim basis for the final three matches of the season following Rennie's departure.

Results and fixtures

Pre Season

Scottish League One

Scottish League Cup

Group stage
Results

Notes

Scottish Challenge Cup

Scottish Cup

Player Statistics

|-
|colspan="8"|Players who left the club during the 2021–22 season
|-

|}

Team Statistics

League table

Transfers

Players in

Players out

Loans in

Loans out

See also
List of Falkirk F.C. seasons

References

Falkirk
Falkirk F.C. seasons